The 1924 Western State Normal Hilltoppers football team represented Western State Normal School (later renamed Western Michigan University) as an independent during the 1924 college football season.  In their first season under head coach Earl Martineau, the Hilltoppers compiled a 5–1–1 record and outscored their opponents, 101 to 46. Tackle Oscar Johnson was the team captain.

Martineau was hired as the Hilltoppers' head coach in June 1924. He had played college football for Minnesota the prior year and been selected by Walter Camp to the 1923 College Football All-America Team.  Minnesota coach William H. Spaulding, who had previously coached the Hilltoppers, recommended Martineau for the job.

Schedule

References

Western State Normal
Western Michigan Broncos football seasons
Western State Normal Hilltoppers football